Hafez is a Persian-language opera by Iranian composer Behzad Abdi to a libretto by Behrouz Gharibpour. It is the second puppet opera by Abdi after the earlier Rumi (2009).

Recording
 Hafez : Mohammad Motamedi, Hossein Alishapour, Babak Sabouri, Mohammad Zakerhossein, Ali Zandevakili, Credo Chamber Choir, National Symphony Orchestra of Ukraine, Vladimir Sirenko Naxos, DDD, 2014, 2021

References

2013 operas
Persian-language operas
Operas